Fred Jonas is a former American football coach. He served as head football coach at Texas A&I University—now known as Texas A&M University–Kingsville—from 1977 to 1978, compiling a record of 14–6–1. Jonas was an assistant at Texas A&I for ten seasons under head coach Gil Steinke, during which time the Javelinas won five NAIA Football National Championships.

Jonas played college football at Hardin–Simmons University Abilene, Texas. He began his coaching career as an assistant at Lamesa High School in Lamesa, Texas from 1958 to 1960 and Roy Miller High School in Corpus Christi, Texas from  1961 to 1965. Jonas spent one year, in 1966, as the head football coach at Richard King High School in Corpus Christi before he was hired at Texas A&I in 1967. He resigned after two season at head coach at Texas A&I to enter private business in the Houston area.

Head coaching record

College

References

1936 births
Living people
Hardin–Simmons Cowboys football coaches
Texas A&M–Kingsville Javelinas football coaches
High school football coaches in Texas